Yan Dongsheng (10 February 1918 – 18 September 2016), also known as Tung-sheng Yen or T. S. Yen, was a Chinese inorganic chemist and material scientist. He was a fellow of the Chinese Academy of Sciences and the Chinese Academy of Engineering. He was a member of the Chinese Communist Party and Jiu San Society. He was a Standing Committee member of the 6th and 7th Chinese People's Political Consultative Conference.

Biography
Yan was born into an intellectual family, in Shanghai, on February 10, 1918. His father was a graduate of Peiyang University (now Tianjin University) and worked in the Beijing-Hankou Railway Administration as an engineer. His mother was an alumna of Hangzhou Woman Normal College. Yan attended Beijing Chongde High School, during that time, he developed an interest in science and English. In 1935 he studied chemistry at the beginning in Tsinghua University, but transferred to Yenching University two year later. After graduation, he worked there as a teaching assistant under his mentor Zhang Zigao.

In 1941, the Pacific War broke out, because of the university suspended for the war, Yan was employed in Private China University alongside Zhang Zigao. The next year, he was employed in Tangshan Kailuan Refractories Company as an engineer.

In 1946, he pursued advanced studies in the United States, first earning doctor's degree in ceramic engineering from the University of Illinois in 1949 and then postdoctoral in 1950.

He returned to China in 1950 and that year became a researcher at the Institute of Metallurgy and Ceramics of Chinese Academy of Sciences (CAS). Then he was promoted to director in 1954. He joined the Jiu San Society in 1956. In 1960s he became the vice-president of the Shanghai Institute of Ceramics, Chinese Academy of Sciences.

During the Cultural Revolution, he was labeled a "reactionary authority" and suffered political persecution.

In 1976, Hua Guofeng and Ye Jianying overthrew the Gang of Four, he was rehabilitated. That same year, he served as president of the Shanghai Institute of Ceramics, Chinese Academy of Sciences and vice-president of the Shanghai Branch of Chinese Academy of Science. In 1977, he was invited to attend the National Working Conference on Science and Education, which was presided by the comeback politician Deng Xiaoping. Yan was elected vice-president of the Chinese Academy of Sciences in 1981, and three years later promoted to First Vice-President and Party Group Secretary positions.

In his later years, he served as special advisor of the Chinese Academy of Sciences, honorary president of the Shanghai Institute of Ceramics, Chinese Academy of Sciences, chairman of the Chinese Chemical Society, honorary chairman of the China Ceramic Society, adjunct professor of Tianjin University, honorary president of Shanghai University, and president of the Shanghai Overseas Returned Scholars Association.

On September 18, 2016, he died of illness in Shanghai, aged 98.

Personal life
In 1943 Yan married his classmate Sun Birou, who is a scientist and professor at Shanghai Jiao Tong University.

Awards
 Third Prize of the National Prize for Natural Sciences (1981)
 First Prize of the National Invention Prize (1981)

See also
 Yan Dongsheng State Park, a state park named in honor of Yan Dongsheng, is located in Tangshan, Hebei.

References

1918 births
2016 deaths
Chemists from Shanghai
Chinese materials scientists
Members of the Chinese Academy of Engineering
Members of the Chinese Academy of Sciences
People's Republic of China politicians from Shanghai
Tsinghua University alumni
TWAS fellows
University of Illinois alumni
Yenching University alumni